Nationwide Airlines (Zambia) Limited was a scheduled, domestic, passenger airline based in Zambia. Its main base was Lusaka International Airport (LUN).

Services 
Nationwide Airlines operated flights between Russia, India, Asia, South Africa and Dubai

Defunct airlines of Zambia
Airlines established in 2001
Airlines disestablished in 2002
2001 establishments in Zambia
2000s disestablishments in Zambia
Companies based in Lusaka